This is a list of prototype games for the Atari 2600 video game console, organized alphabetically by name.  See Lists of video games for related lists.

Games